The 2014–15 National Youth League (Also known as the Foxtel National Youth League for sponsorship reasons) was the seventh season of the Australian National Youth League competition. The season ran in parallel with the 2014–15 A-League season.

Teams

Standings

Positions by round

NOTES:
 Melbourne Victory were tied with Newcastle Jets at the end of Round 1, as were Brisbane Roar and Central Coast Mariners.
 Newcastle Jets and Sydney FC have a game in hand between Rounds 2 and 13, with their Round 2 game to be played before the start of Round 14 on Tuesday 27 January.
 Western Sydney Wanderers and FFA Centre of Excellence have a game in hand between Rounds 7 and 13, with their Round 2 game to be played before the start of Round 14 on Tuesday 27 January.

Fixtures

Round 1

Round 2

Round 3

Round 4

Round 5

Round 6

Round 7

Round 8

Round 9

Round 10

Round 11

Round 12

Round 13

Round 14

Round 15

Round 16

Round 17

Round 18

Table of results

Season statistics

Goals scored

Clean sheets

End-of-season awards
George Blackwood of Sydney FC Youth and Liam Youlley of Western Sydney Wanderers FC Youth were voted co-winners of the Foxtel National Youth League Player of the Year Award while Brisbane Roar FC Youth was selected as the winner of the Foxtel National Youth League Fair Play Award.

References

External links
Official National Youth League website

2014–15 A-League season
A-League National Youth League seasons